Karunalaya Hospital is a hospital in Wandoor in the state of Kerala in Southern India. It was famous in early years for treatment of poison and in modern time it is clossed due to not having advanced facilities 

The hospital was built around 1958 by Rev. Henry Otten.

Facilities
The hospital staff consists of three physicians who look after patients and organize health camps, workshops and provide care in several villages .

References

Hospitals in Kerala
Buildings and structures in Wayanad district
1958 establishments in Kerala
Hospitals established in 1958

...